This is a list of villages in Vratsa Province, Bulgaria.

Banitsa
Bardarski Geran
Borovan
Chelopek
Chiren
Dolna Kremena
Dobrolevo
Eliseyna
Galatin
Gradeshnitsa
Hayredin
Kriva Bara
Mihaylovo
Ochindol
Rogozen
Ruska Bela
Saraevo
Staro Selo
Tipchenitsa
Virovsko
Voyvodovo

See also
List of villages in Bulgaria

 
Vratsa